Lynn Russell may refer to:
Lynn M. Russell, atmospheric scientist at Scripps Institution of Oceanography
Lynn Russell (character)

See also 
 Lynne Russell, American journalist and author
Lynn Russell Chadwick, English sculptor and artist
Lynn Russell Williams, Canadian labor leader
Theresa Lynn Russell, American actress